Penama is one of the six provinces of Vanuatu, located in the northeast of the country and consisting of three major islands:
 Ambae (or Aoba)
 Maewo
 Pentecost

The name Penama is derived from the initial letters of PENtecost, Ambae and MAewo.

Population
It has a population of 30,819 (2009 census)  people and an area of 1,198 km2. Its capital is Saratamata on Ambae, but there are plans to move the capital to a different island due to a volcanic eruption

Islands

References

External links

 
Provinces of Vanuatu
States and territories established in 1994